San Juan County is a county located in the Salish Sea in the far northwestern corner of the U.S. state of Washington. As of the 2020 census, its population was 17,788. The county seat and only incorporated city is Friday Harbor, located on San Juan Island. The county was formed on October 31, 1873, from Whatcom County and is named for the San Juan Islands, which are in turn named for Juan Vicente de Güemes, 2nd Count of Revillagigedo, the Viceroy of New Spain.

Although the islands themselves have no state highways, the ferry routes serving the islands are designated as part of the state highway system.

History

The San Juan Islands were the subject of a territorial dispute between Great Britain and the United States from 1846 to 1872, leading to the Pig War in 1859. The bloodless conflict ended through arbitration led by Kaiser Wilhelm I, which awarded the islands to the United States. San Juan County was home to Henry Cayou, one of the first elected officials of Native descent in Washington.

Geography
It is the smallest county in Washington by land area and fourth-smallest by total area.

San Juan County is a cluster of more than 400 islands and rocks with elevations above mean high tide. 134 of these islands and rocks are named. The county has a rugged, rocky shoreline and several mountains.

Geographic features
 Boundary Pass
 Haro Strait
 Rosario Strait
 San Juan Islands
 Strait of Georgia
 Strait of Juan de Fuca

Major islands
There are approximately 743 islands and rocks in the San Juan Island chain. Most of the county's population lives on the largest four islands, which are the only county islands served by the Washington State Ferries. The four largest islands are:
 Orcas Island (149.43 km2/57.7 sq mi)
 San Juan Island (143.62 km2/55.5 sq mi)
 Lopez Island (76.57 km2/29.6 sq mi)
 Shaw Island (19.64 km2/7.6 sq mi)

Adjacent counties
 Whatcom County – northeast
 Skagit County – east
 Island County – southeast
 Jefferson County – south
 Clallam County – south/southwest
 Capital Regional District, British Columbia – west

National protected areas
 San Juan Island National Historical Park
 San Juan Islands National Wildlife Refuge
 San Juan Islands National Monument
 San Juan Wilderness

Demographics

2000 census
As of the census of 2000 there were 14,077 people living in the county in 6,466 households and 4,015 families, resulting in a population density of 80 people per square mile (31/km2).  The census reported 9,752 housing units at an average density of 56 per square mile (22/km2).  The residents of the county reported their race as 95.0% White, 0.3% Black or African American, 0.8% Native American, 0.9% Asian, 0.1% Pacific Islander, 0.9% from other races, and 2.0% from two or more races.  2.4% of the population identified themselves as Hispanic or Latino of any race.  In response to the census question concerning ancestry, 16.7% reported English ancestry; 15.0%, German; 11.6%, Irish; 5.7%, United States or American; 5.4%, French; and 5.0%, Norwegian.

Of the 6,466 households, 22.90% had children under the age of 18; 51.80% were married couples living together; 6.90% had a female householder with no husband present; 37.90% were not families; 30.60% were individuals; and 10.70% were individuals 65 years of age or older, living alone.  The average household size was 2.16 persons and the average family size was 2.65.

19.1% of the county's population was under the age of 18; 4.5% ranged in age from 18 to 24; 21.7%, 25–44; 35.7%, 45–64; and 19.0%, 65 or older.  The median age was 47 years. For every 100 females, there were 95.10 males.  For every 100 females age 18 and over, there were 93.00 males.

The median income for a household in the county was $43,491, and the median income for a family was $51,835. Males had a median income of $36,250 versus $26,516 for females. The per capita income for the county was $30,603.  About 6.0% of families and 9.2% of the population were below the poverty line, including 12.4% of those under age 18 and 3.1% of those age 65 or over.

San Juan County has the highest per capita income in the state of Washington. Deer Harbor, located in the county, has a per capita income exceeding $100,000. Waldron Island, with a population of 104 in the 2000 census, is considered one of the most impoverished areas in Washington, with about 56% of the people living in poverty.

In a survey by the University of Wisconsin Population Health Institute and the Robert Wood Johnson Foundation, San Juan County was ranked the healthiest in the state of Washington.

2010 census
As of the 2010 census, there were 15,769 people, 7,613 households, and 4,438 families residing in the county. The racial makeup of the county was 92.6% white, 1.1% Asian, 0.7% American Indian, 0.3% black or African American, 0.1% Pacific islander, 2.6% from other races, and 2.5% from two or more races. Those of Hispanic or Latino origin made up 5.4% of the population. The largest ancestry groups were:

19.6% German
19.3% English
14.1% Irish
5.6% Norwegian
5.6% Scottish
5.0% French
4.4% Swedish
4.2% Mexican
3.6% Italian
3.1% Scotch-Irish
2.9% Dutch
2.8% American
2.1% Welsh
1.8% Polish
1.7% Russian
1.6% Danish
1.4% British
1.1% Swiss
1.0% Canadian

Of the 7,613 households, 19.3% had children under the age of 18 living with them, 48.3% were married couples living together, 6.6% had a female householder with no husband present, 41.7% were non-families, and 34.0% of all households were made up of individuals. The average household size was 2.05 and the average family size was 2.56. The median age was 52.7 years.

The median income for a household in the county was $50,726 and the median income for a family was $61,096. Males had a median income of $44,190 versus $32,911 for females. The per capita income for the county was $35,487. About 7.6% of families and 10.1% of the population were below the poverty line, including 13.3% of those under age 18 and 5.2% of those age 65 or over.

Religion
According to a 2020 survey by the Public Religion Research Institute, San Juan County has the highest concentration of religiously unaffiliated people of any county in the United States. The unaffiliated make up 49% of the population.

Law enforcement

The San Juan County Sheriff's Office is responsible for maintaining the county jail, providing security at the San Juan County Superior Court, serving civil processes, coordinating emergency management among the county's emergency services, and maintaining law and order throughout the county, as there are no municipal police departments in San Juan County. Due to San Juan County's island geography, the sheriff also operates a robust marine unit equipped with four small patrol craft, used for search and rescue and for transporting deputies and prisoners to and from remote islands. The sheriff has a mutual aid agreement with the National Park Service Law Enforcement Rangers assigned to the San Juan Island National Historical Park and, in the event of an exigency, can also request assistance from the Washington State Patrol's District 7 field detachment.

The county's first sheriff was Stephen Boyce, who was known among area Native Americans as Hyas Tyee ("great and powerful man" in the Coast Salish language). Boyce helped investigate the sensational "Kanaka Joe" murders of 1873, and supervised the hanging of Joe "Kanaka Joe" Nuanna.

Politics
The county has voted heavily Democratic in presidential elections since the 1990s. The only area of the county won by George W. Bush in 2004 was the Decatur Island/Blakely Island precinct, with just over 50 votes. Waldron Island's precinct voted 96.5% for John Kerry. In 2006, Maria Cantwell, the Democrat running for re-election to the U.S. Senate, won all precincts. The county's legislative body is the San Juan County Council, which was created in 2006.

Communities

Town
 Friday Harbor (county seat)

Unincorporated communities

 Argyle
 Beach Haven
 Blakely Island
 Buckhorn
 Camp Orkila
 Crane Island
 Decatur
 Decatur Island
 Deer Harbor
 Doe Bay
 Dolphin
 Eastsound
 Islandale
 Lakedale
 Lopez Island
 Olga
 Orcas Village
 Orcas Island
 Port Stanley
 Prevost
 Pump Station
 Richardson
 Roche Harbor
 Rockland
 Rosario
 Sea Acre
 Shaw Island
 Thatcher
 The Tee
 Waldron
 West Beach
 West Sound
 Yacht Haven

See also
 National Register of Historic Places listings in San Juan County, Washington

References

External links
 San Juan County official website

 
1873 establishments in Washington Territory
Populated places established in 1873
Western Washington